Glipa inexpectata is a species of beetle in the genus Glipa. It was first described in 2000.

References

inexpectata
Beetles described in 2000